Tony Parker: The Final Shot is an 2021 French documentary film, directed by Florent Bodin.

Cast 
 Tony Parker

References

External links
 
 

2021 documentary films
2021 films
French documentary films
French-language Netflix original films
2020s French films